Lauvkollen  is a mountain in the municipalities of Sande in Vestfold and of Drammen in Buskerud, Norway

External links
Map of Lauvkollen

Sande, Vestfold
Drammen
Mountains of Viken
Mountains of Vestfold og Telemark